Tynbakhtino (Tımbaqtı) is a rural locality (a village) in Krasnokholmsky Selsoviet, Kaltasinsky District, Bashkortostan, Russia. The population was 70 as of 2010. There are 2 streets.

Geography 
Tynbakhtino is located 20 km east of Kaltasy (the district's administrative centre) by road. Malokurazovo is the nearest rural locality.

References 

Rural localities in Kaltasinsky District